Brendan Lane was a Gaelic football goalkeeper from Kerry, Ireland. He played with his local Brosna club and the Kerry intercounty team. He only played one game with the Kerry senior team in the first round of the 1994 Munster Championship.

At club level with St.Kieran's he won a Kerry Senior Football Championship in 1988. He also won a Novice Football Championship with Brosna in 1984 and was still a player-manager when they made the final in 2009 and was still part of the team that won the title in 2011. He also won a County Junior Championship in 1989.

References

Year of birth missing (living people)
Living people
Brossna Gaelic footballers
Kerry inter-county Gaelic footballers
Gaelic football goalkeepers
Gaelic football player-managers